The Axis order of battle for the invasion of Yugoslavia was made up of the various operational formations of the German Wehrmacht and Waffen-SS, Italian Armed Forces and Hungarian Armed Forces that participated in the invasion of Yugoslavia during World War II, commencing on 6 April 1941. It involved the German 2nd Army, with elements of the 12th Army and a panzer group combined with overwhelming Luftwaffe (German Air Force) support. The eighteen German divisions included five panzer divisions, two motorised infantry divisions and two mountain divisions. The German force also included two well-equipped independent motorised regiments and was supported by over 800 aircraft. The Italian 2nd Army and 9th Army committed a total of 22 divisions, and the Royal Italian Air Force had over 650 aircraft available to support the invasion. The Hungarian 3rd Army also participated, with support from the Royal Hungarian Air Force (MKHL).

The Axis ground forces had effectively surrounded the Kingdom of Yugoslavia before the invasion began. The German 2nd Army, consisting of one motorised, one mountain, and two infantry corps was concentrated in southwestern Hungary and southeastern Austria, poised to drive south and east. One motorised corps of the German 12th Army was assembled near Sofia, Bulgaria, along with one motorised corps of the First Panzer Group, and these formations were assigned the task of striking the strongest Yugoslav formations stationed along the eastern border of the country. A further motorised corps was deployed near Timișoara in western Romania, ready to thrust south into the Banat region. The Italian 2nd Army, consisting of one fast corps, one motorised corps and three infantry corps was assembled in northeastern Italy, with the task of driving southeast down the Dalmatian coast. The Italian 9th Army, comprising two corps and a sector defence command, was stationed in occupied northern Albania, and its stance was largely defensive. The Hungarian 3rd Army was concentrated along the Yugoslav border largely between the Danube and the Tisza, with the objective of seizing the Bačka and Baranja regions.

German, Italian and Hungarian air support was concentrated in Austria, Italy, southern Hungary, southern Romania, western Bulgaria and Albania. In total, over 1,500 Axis aircraft were available to support the invasion. Naval forces were limited to a few destroyers of the Royal Italian Navy operating in the Adriatic Sea.

German

German land forces
The German formations committed to the invasion of Yugoslavia included over 337,000 men, and more than 2,000 mortars, 1,500 artillery pieces, 1,100 anti-tank guns, 875 tanks, and 740 other armoured fighting vehicles. The German land forces were under the overall direction of the commander of the German Army Generalfeldmarschall (Field Marshal) Walther von Brauchitsch.

2nd Army

The German 2nd Army was commanded by Generaloberst (General) Maximilian von Weichs, consisted of one motorised, one mountain, and two infantry corps, and was assembled in southwestern Hungary and southeastern Austria. The LII Infantry Corps suffered significant delays in deploying to its assembly area and was initially held in reserve. According to Schreiber, Stegemann and Vogel, three panzer divisions, four infantry divisions and one motorised infantry division were planned as reserves for the 2nd Army, but they did not participate in the fighting in Yugoslavia. According to Niehorster, these divisions were held as theatre reserves or were allocated to various formations. 2nd Army was supported by three bridging battalions and a road construction battalion.

XXXXVI Motorised Corps was supported by three motorised heavy artillery battalions, a motorised pioneer battalion, a road construction battalion, six bridging columns, and two Luftwaffe anti-aircraft battalions. XXXXIX Mountain Corps included two motorised heavy artillery battalions and a road construction battalion. LI Infantry Corps included seven motorised heavy artillery battalions, two assault gun battalions, two motorised pioneer battalions, two bridging battalions, two road construction battalions, and twelve bridging columns.

12th Army

The German 12th Army was commanded by Generalfeldmarschall Wilhelm List, and consisted of one mountain, three infantry and two motorised corps.  Most of the 12th Army was deployed along the Bulgarian-Greek border in preparation for the invasion of Greece, and of the corps commanded by List, only the two motorised corps were committed to the invasion of Yugoslavia. For the first phase of the invasion of Yugoslavia, the First Panzer Group was also assigned to the 12th Army.

XXXX Motorised Corps was supported by one motorised anti-tank battalion, three motorised heavy artillery battalions, two motorised pioneer battalions, two bridging battalions, and three motorised bridging columns. XXXXI Motorised Corps included two motorised heavy artillery battalions and a motorised pioneer battalion.

First Panzer Group

The First Panzer Group was commanded by Generaloberst Paul Ludwig Ewald von Kleist, and according to Schreiber, Stegemann and Vogel, it consisted of XIV Motorised Corps with two panzer divisions, one mountain, one motorised infantry and one infantry division. According to Niehorster, the XXXXI Motorised Corps was also assigned to First Panzer Group. It assembled northwest of Sofia, Bulgaria.

The First Panzer Group was supported by one motorised heavy artillery battalion, one motorised pioneer battalion, one pioneer battalion, two bridging battalions, and two bridging columns. Supporting units of XIV Motorised Corps included two motorised heavy artillery battalions, a motorised pioneer battalion, two bridging columns and one Luftwaffe motorised anti-aircraft battalion.

Commanders

German Air Force
The Luftwaffe operated out of bases in Austria, Romania and Bulgaria during the invasion of Yugoslavia. In total, the Germans had over 809 aircraft available to support the invasion of Yugoslavia, more than half of which were positioned in Bulgaria to support the simultaneous invasion of Greece. In total, the Germans fielded 296 fighter aircraft, 89 light bombers, 26 medium bombers and 23 reconnaissance aircraft, and more than 318 dive bombers and 57 heavy fighters. In addition, a reconnaissance squadron equipped with Henschel Hs 126 two-seater reconnaissance aircraft was attached to most of the corps headquarters and every panzer division of the German ground forces. Luftwaffe anti-aircraft units were also attached to the German land forces.

4th Air Fleet

The Luftwaffe 4th Air Fleet ( IV) was commanded by General der Flieger (Lieutenant General) Alexander Löhr, had its headquarters in Vienna, and direct command units based on airfields in western Austria. These units included one squadron of the 121st Reconnaissance Group ( 121), the entire 51st Bomber Wing ( 51, KG 51), and four bomber groups drawn from the 2nd, 3rd and 4th Bomber Wings (KG 2, KG 3 and KG 4). In total, the 4th Air Fleet had 25 medium bombers, 89 light bombers, 55 dive bombers, 6 reconnaissance aircraft and 1 heavy fighter available in Austria to support the invasion of Yugoslavia.

Fliegerführer Graz
Fliegerführer Graz was commanded by Oberstleutnant (Lieutenant Colonel) Karl Christ, commander of the 3rd Dive Bomber Wing ( 3, StG 3). It was located in Graz, Austria, and consisted of the headquarters and II Group of StG 3, the headquarters and II Group of the 54th Fighter Wing ( 54, JG 54) (less one squadron), and I Group of the 27th Fighter Wing (JG 27). In total, Fliegerführer Graz had 54 fighters, 1 medium bomber and 35 dive bombers available to support the invasion of Yugoslavia.

Fliegerführer Arad
Fliegerführer Arad was commanded by Oberstleutnant Clemens Graf von Schönborn-Wiesentheid, commander of the 77th Dive Bomber Wing (StG 77). With its headquarters in Arad, Romania, it consisted of the headquarters, I and III Groups of StG 77, headquarters, II and III Groups of the 77th Fighter Wing (JG 77), one squadron of II Group of JG 54, III Group of JG 54 and I Group of the 26th Heavy Fighter Wing ( 26, ZG 26). In total, Fliegerführer Arad had 116 fighters, 31 heavy fighters and 68 dive bombers available to support the invasion of Yugoslavia.

VIII Air Corps

The VIII Air Corps ( VIII) was commanded by General der Flieger Wolfram Freiherr von Richthofen, who had operational control of all air operations for the invasion. With its headquarters in Gorna Dzhumaya, Bulgaria, it was based at various airfields in western Bulgaria, and consisted of one squadron of the 11th Reconnaissance Group, the headquarters, I and II Groups of the 2nd Dive Bomber Wing (StG 2), I Group of StG 3, the headquarters, II and III Groups of the 27th Fighter Wing, a fighter group and a ground attack group from the 1st Demonstration Wing ( 1, LG 1), and a reinforced dive bomber group from the 2nd Demonstration Wing. In total, the VIII Air Corps had 126 fighters and 17 reconnaissance aircraft, and more than 25 heavy fighters and 160 dive bombers available to support the invasions of both Yugoslavia and Greece.

X Air Corps
The X Air Corps ( X) was based in Sicily, and consisted of four bomber groups, one heavy fighter group and one fighter squadron with a total of 168 aircraft. It was available to provide on-call support to the 4th Air Fleet as required, but only a few units played any part in supporting the invasion because the primary task of X Air Corps was interdicting Allied supply convoys to Malta. Units earmarked for support to the invasion included 7th Squadron of 26th Fighter Wing (JG 26) equipped with Messerschmitt Bf 109E fighters, and III Group of ZG 26, flying Messerschmitt Bf 110C/D heavy fighters.

Commanders

Italian

Italian ground forces
The Italian 2nd Army and 9th Army committed a total of 22 divisions to the operation, comprising around 300,000 troops. The Italian ground forces included the Italian garrison of Zara, which was an Italian enclave on the Dalmatian coast.

2nd Army

The Italian 2nd Army was commanded by Generale d’Armata (General) Vittorio Ambrosio, and consisted of one fast corps, one motorised corps and three infantry corps, and was assembled in northeastern Italy. The 2nd Army was supported by a motorised engineer regiment including three bridging battalions, a chemical battalion, fifteen territorial battalions, and two garrison battalions.

V Corps support units included three motorised artillery regiments comprising thirteen battalions, four machine gun battalions (two motorised and two pack animal), three Blackshirt legions of battalion size, a motorised anti-aircraft battalion, a sapper assault battalion and a road construction battalion. VI Corps included four motorised artillery regiments with a total of sixteen battalions, two machine gun battalions (one motorised, one pack animal) and a motorised anti-aircraft regiment. XI Corps included one motorised artillery regiment comprising four battalions, three machine gun battalions (one motorised, one pack animal and one static), and six Blackshirt legions of battalion size. The Motorised Corps was supported by a motorised artillery regiment consisting of three battalions, and an motorised engineer battalion.

9th Army
The elements of the Italian 9th Army that were involved in the campaign were commanded by Generale d’Armata (General) Alessandro Pirzio Biroli, and consisted of two infantry corps and some sector troops assembled in northern Albania.

XIV Corps was supported by a cavalry regiment, three Border Guard battalions, a Finance Guard battalion and two military police battalions. The XVII Corps included the Diamanti Blackshirt group which incorporated six Blackshirt regiments comprising two battalions each, the Albanian-raised Skanderbeg Blackshirt regiment of two battalions, another Blackshirt regiment of two battalions, a cavalry regiment, a Bersaglieri motorcycle battalion, three Border Guard battalions, one Finance Guard battalion, a motorised artillery regiment of three battalions, a military police battalion, and a tank company equipped with Fiat M13/40 light tanks. The Librazhd Sector included a motorised artillery regiment of four battalions, a bicycle-mounted Bersaglieri regiment, a cavalry regiment, the Biscaccianti Blackshirt group which incorporated two Blackshirt regiments with a total of five battalions, the regimental-sized Agostini Blackshirt Forest Militia, and the Briscotto group, a regimental-sized formation consisting of one Alpini battalion and two Finance Guard battalions.

Zara garrison
The Zara garrison numbered about 9,000 men under the overall command of Generale di Brigata (Brigadier) Emilio Giglioli. The garrison consisted of two main groupings and an assortment of supporting units. The two main groupings were the regimental-sized Fronte a Terra (Land Front), which comprised three static machine gun battalions and a bicycle-mounted Bersaglieri battalion, and the battalion-strength Fronte a Mare (Sea Front), which consisted of two machine gun companies, an anti-aircraft battery, a coastal artillery battery and a naval artillery battery. Supporting units consisted of an artillery regiment of three battalions, two independent artillery battalions, a machine gun battalion, a motorised anti-aircraft battalion (less one battery), an engineer battalion, a company of Blackshirts, and a company of L3/35 tankettes.

Commanders

Royal Italian Air Force
The Royal Italian Air Force operated out of bases in southeastern and northeastern Italy and Albania during the invasion of Yugoslavia. In total, the Italians had 658 aircraft available to support the invasion, 222 of which were positioned in Albania to also support the German invasion of Greece. These aircraft comprised 296 fighter aircraft, 40 dive bombers, 192 medium bombers, 12 bomber floatplanes and 118 reconnaissance aircraft.

2nd Air Force

The headquarters of the 2nd Air Force was at Padua, in northeastern Italy under the command of Generale di Squadra Aerea (Lieutenant General) Tullio Toccolini. It comprised two fighter wings, one bomber wing, two independent bomber groups, three reconnaissance groups and one independent reconnaissance squadron. In total, the 2nd Air Force had 90 fighters, 61 medium bombers and 49 reconnaissance aircraft available to support the invasion of Yugoslavia.

4th Air Force

The headquarters of the 4th Air Force was at Bari, in southern Italy under the command of Generale di Squadra Aerea Augusto Bonola. It comprised two independent fighter groups and one independent fighter squadron, four bomber wings, one combined bomber and naval bomber wing, two independent bomber groups and one independent dive bomber equipped with German Junkers Ju 87B Stuka aircraft. In total, the 4th Air Force had 73 fighters, 20 dive bombers, 131 medium bombers and 12 bomber floatplanes available to support the invasion of Yugoslavia.

Air Command Albania

The headquarters of Air Command Albania was located at Tirana, Albania under the command of Generale di Squadra Aerea Ferruccio Ranza. It comprised five fighter groups, one dive bomber group equipped with German Junkers Ju 87B Stuka aircraft, three independent reconnaissance groups and two independent reconnaissance squadrons. In total, the Italians had 133 fighters, 20 dive bombers and 69 reconnaissance aircraft available in Albania to support the invasions of Yugoslavia and Greece.

Royal Italian Navy
Three destroyers of the Royal Italian Navy were deployed into the Adriatic in direct support of the invasion, and other units were tasked to suppress the Royal Yugoslav Navy.

Hungarian

Royal Hungarian Army

The Hungarian Army committed the Mobile, I, IV and V Corps of Vezérezredes (Lieutenant General) Elemér Gorondy-Novák's 3rd Army to the invasion. The 1st Parachute Battalion was earmarked for airborne operations. The Hungarian invasion force was deployed along the Yugoslav border largely between the Danube and the Tisza.

Royal Hungarian Air Force

The Royal Hungarian Air Force (MKHL) committed its 1st Air Brigade to the invasion, consisting of four fighter groups of the 1st and 2nd Air Regiments flying Fiat CR.42 biplane fighters, one reinforced bomber group from the 3rd and 4th Air Regiments with Junkers Ju 86 and Caproni Ca.135bis twin-engined bombers, and one reconnaissance group from the 5th Air Regiment operating Heinkel He 170A reconnaissance aircraft. Savoia-Marchetti SM.75 transports were used to transport the 1st Parachute Battalion.

Notes

Footnotes

References

Books

Journals and papers

Web

 
 
 
 
 
 
 
 
 
 

World War II orders of battle
Balkans campaign (World War II)